Tetracha bilunata is a species of tiger beetle that was described by Johann Christoph Friedrich Klug in 1834. It can be found in Bolivia, Brazil, Paraguay and Peru.

References

Cicindelidae
Beetles described in 1834
Beetles of South America